The Kniksen Award, established in 1990, honors the best players in the Norwegian football premiership. The award is named after the legendary Norwegian football player Roald Jensen, nicknamed "Kniksen".

Categories

Category A 

A jury composed of players, leaders, coaches and officials in the Tippeligaen, nominates and choose the winners in each category. All the nominees must play in the Norwegian top division. The player's nationality does not matter. The categories are:

 Goalkeeper of the Year
 Defender of the Year
 Midfielder of the Year
 Striker of the Year
 Coach of the Year 
 Referee of the Year

In 2006, two further categories were also awarded: Young player of the year, and 1. divisjon player of the year.

Category B (the main awards)

Kniksen of the Year 

This is awarded to the best Norwegian player of the year.  The Kniksen of the year award was replaced by "Gullballen" (English: The Golden Ball) in 2014. The player can play abroad or in Norway and can be won by both female and male players.

Kniksen's honour award 

The Kniksen's honour award is awarded to a person or a team, who have made a great contribution to Norwegian football. This award can be considered a lifetime achievement award, and is recognized as Norwegian football's most prestigious award. The Kniksen's honour award was not awarded in 2005 or 2006, but was resumed in 2007.

The main awards were presented annually at Idrettsgallaen at Hamar in January, but in 2007, all Kniksen awards were presented at a separate award show in November.

Winners 
Source:

1990s

1990
Goalkeeper of the Year: Einar Rossbach, Tromsø IL
Defender of the Year:   Per-Ove Ludvigsen, Fyllingen Fotball
Midfielder of the Year: Per Egil Ahlsen, SK Brann
Striker of the Year:    Tore André Dahlum, Rosenborg BK
Coach of the Year:      Nils Arne Eggen, Rosenborg BK
Referee of the Year:    Rune Pedersen, SK Sprint-Jeløy
Kniksen of the Year:    Erik Thorstvedt, Tottenham Hotspur
Kniksen's honour award: Not Awarded

1991
Goalkeeper of the Year: Frode Grodås, Lillestrøm SK
Defender of the Year:   Pål Lydersen, IK Start
Midfielder of the Year: Øyvind Leonhardsen, Molde FK
Striker of the Year:    Gøran Sørloth, Rosenborg BK
Coach of the Year:      Benny Lennartsson, Viking FK
Referee of the Year:    Rune Pedersen, SK Sprint-Jeløy
Kniksen of the Year:    Rune Bratseth, Werder Bremen
Kniksen's honour award: Terje Kojedal, Ham-Kam and Sverre Brandhaug, Rosenborg BK

1992
Goalkeeper of the Year: Ola By Rise, Rosenborg BK
Defender of the Year:   Roger Nilsen, Viking FK
Midfielder of the Year: Erik Mykland, IK Start
Striker of the Year:    Gøran Sørloth, Rosenborg BK
Coach of the Year:      Per Brogeland, Kongsvinger IL
Referee of the Year:    Rune Pedersen, SK Sprint-Jeløy
Kniksen of the Year:    Rune Bratseth, Werder Bremen
Kniksen's honour award: Egil "Drillo" Olsen, Manager Norway and Per Egil Ahlsen, Fredrikstad FK

1993
Goalkeeper of the Year: Frode Grodås, Lillestrøm SK
Defender of the Year:   Tore Pedersen, SK Brann
Midfielder of the Year: Øyvind Leonhardsen, Rosenborg BK
Striker of the Year:    Mons Ivar Mjelde, Lillestrøm SK
Coach of the Year:      Trond Sollied, FK Bodø/Glimt
Referee of the Year:    Roy Helge Olsen, SFK Lyn
Kniksen of the Year:    Egil "Drillo" Olsen, Manager Norway
Kniksen's honour award: Norway women's national football team

1994
Goalkeeper of the Year: Thomas Myhre, Viking FK
Defender of the Year:   Pål Lydersen, IK Start
Midfielder of the Year: Erik Mykland, IK Start
Striker of the Year:    Harald Martin Brattbakk, Rosenborg BK
Coach of the Year:      Nils Arne Eggen, Rosenborg BK
Referee of the Year:    Rune Pedersen, SK Sprint-Jeløy
Kniksen of the Year:    Rune Bratseth, Werder Bremen
Kniksen's honour award: Per Ravn Omdal President, Norwegian Football Association and Rune Bratseth, Werder Bremen

1995
Goalkeeper of the Year: Morten Bakke, Molde FK
Defender of the Year:   Erik Hoftun, Rosenborg BK
Midfielder of the Year: Ståle Solbakken, Lillestrøm SK
Striker of the Year:    Harald Martin Brattbakk, Rosenborg BK
Coach of the Year:      Nils Arne Eggen, Rosenborg BK
Referee of the Year:    Rune Pedersen, SK Sprint-Jeløy
Kniksen of the Year:    Hege Riise, Norway
Kniksen's honour award: Ola By Rise, Rosenborg BK

1996
Goalkeeper of the Year: Jørn Jamtfall, Rosenborg BK
Defender of the Year:   Erik Hoftun, Rosenborg BK
Midfielder of the Year: Trond Egil Soltvedt, Rosenborg BK
Striker of the Year:    Mons Ivar Mjelde, SK Brann
Coach of the Year:      Nils Arne Eggen, Rosenborg BK
Referee of the Year:    Rune Pedersen, SK Sprint-Jeløy
Kniksen of the Year:    Ole Gunnar Solskjær, Manchester United 
Kniksen's honour award: Erik Thorstvedt, Viking FK

1997
Goalkeeper of the Year: Frode Olsen, Stabæk IF
Defender of the Year:   Erik Hoftun, Rosenborg BK
Midfielder of the Year: Bent Skammelsrud, Rosenborg BK
Striker of the Year:    Harald Martin Brattbakk, Rosenborg BK
Coach of the Year:      Dag Vidar Kristoffersen, Strømsgodset IF
Referee of the Year:    Rune Pedersen, SK Sprint-Jeløy
Kniksen of the Year:    Nils Arne Eggen, manager Rosenborg BK 
Kniksen's honour award: Rosenborg BK

1998
Goalkeeper of the Year: Frode Olsen, Stabæk IF
Defender of the Year:   Erik Hoftun, Rosenborg BK
Midfielder of the Year: Roar Strand, Rosenborg BK
Striker of the Year:    Sigurd Rushfeldt, Rosenborg BK
Coach of the Year:      Trond Sollied, Rosenborg BK
Referee of the Year:    Rune Pedersen, SK Sprint-Jeløy
Kniksen of the Year:    Tore André Flo, Chelsea F.C. 
Kniksen's honour award: Rune Pedersen, SK Sprint-Jeløy

1999
Goalkeeper of the Year: Frode Olsen, Stabæk IF
Defender of the Year:   Erik Hoftun, Rosenborg BK
Midfielder of the Year: Magnus Svensson, Viking FK
Striker of the Year:    Rune Lange, Tromsø IL
Coach of the Year:      Nils Arne Eggen, Rosenborg BK
Referee of the Year:    Rune Pedersen, SK Sprint-Jeløy
Kniksen of the Year:    Henning Berg, Manchester United 
Kniksen's honour award: Nils Johan Semb, (Manager Norway) and Jostein Flo

2000s

2000
Goalkeeper of the Year: Emille Baron, Lillestrøm SK
Defender of the Year:   Erik Hoftun, Rosenborg BK
Midfielder of the Year: Ørjan Berg, Rosenborg BK
Striker of the Year:    Thorstein Helstad, SK Brann
Coach of the Year:      Benny Lennartsson, Viking FK
Referee of the Year:    Rune Pedersen, SK Sprint-Jeløy
Kniksen of the Year:    Erik Mykland, 1860 München 
Kniksen's honour award: Jahn Ivar Jakobsen, Rosenborg BK and Norway women's national football team

2001
Goalkeeper of the Year: Arni Gautur Arason, Rosenborg BK
Defender of the Year:   Torgeir Bjarmann, Lillestrøm SK
Midfielder of the Year: Ørjan Berg, Rosenborg BK
Striker of the Year:    Clayton Zane, Lillestrøm SK
Coach of the Year:      Arne Erlandsen, Lillestrøm SK
Referee of the Year:    Tom Henning Øvrebø, Nordstrand IF
Kniksen of the Year:    Ørjan Berg, Rosenborg BK 
Kniksen's honour award: Bent Skammelsrud and Roar Strand, Rosenborg BK

2002
Goalkeeper of the Year: Erik Holtan, Odd Grenland
Defender of the Year:   Tommy Berntsen, FC Lyn Oslo
Midfielder of the Year: Ørjan Berg, Rosenborg BK
Striker of the Year:    Bengt Sæternes, FK Bodø/Glimt
Coach of the Year:      Sture Fladmark, FC Lyn Oslo
Referee of the Year:    Tom Henning Øvrebø, Nordstrand IF
Kniksen of the Year:    André Bergdølmo, Ajax 
Kniksen's honour award: Nils Arne Eggen, Rosenborg BK

2003
Goalkeeper of the Year: Espen Johnsen, Rosenborg BK
Defender of the Year:   Vidar Riseth, Rosenborg BK
Midfielder of the Year: Martin Andresen, Stabæk
Striker of the Year:    Harald Martin Brattbakk, Rosenborg BK
Coach of the Year:      Øystein Gåre, FK Bodø/Glimt
Referee of the Year:    Tom Henning Øvrebø, Nordstrand IF
Kniksen of the Year:    Martin Andresen, Stabæk IF
Kniksen's honour award: Per Ravn Omdal, President, Norwegian Football Association

2004
Goalkeeper of the Year: Ali Al-Habsi, FC Lyn Oslo
Defender of the Year:   Erik Hagen, Vålerenga IF
Midfielder of the Year: Ardian Gashi, Vålerenga IF
Striker of the Year:    Alexander Ødegaard, Sogndal IL
Coach of the Year:      Ståle Solbakken, Ham-Kam
Referee of the Year:    Terje Hauge, Olsvik IL
Kniksen of the Year:    Erik Hagen, Vålerenga IF
Kniksen's honour award: Henning Berg and Hege Riise

2005
Goalkeeper of the Year: Arni Gautur Arason, Vålerenga IF
Defender of the Year:   Bård Borgersen, IK Start
Midfielder of the Year: Kristofer Hæstad, IK Start
Striker of the Year:    Ole Martin Årst, Tromsø IL
Coach of the Year:      Tom Nordlie, IK Start
Referee of the Year:    Tom Henning Øvrebø, Nordstrand IF
Kniksen of the Year:    John Carew, Lyon
Kniksen's honour award: Not Awarded

2006
Goalkeeper of the Year: Håkon Opdal, SK Brann
Defender of the Year: Per Nilsson, Odd Grenland
Midfielder of the Year: Robert Koren, Lillestrøm SK
Striker of the Year: Steffen Iversen, Rosenborg BK 
Coach of the Year: Knut Tørum, Rosenborg BK
Referee of the Year: Tom Henning Øvrebø, Nordstrand IF
Young Player of the Year: Chinedu Obasi Ogbuke, FC Lyn Oslo
1. divisjon Player of the Year: Mattias Andersson, Strømsgodset IF
Kniksen of the Year: John Arne Riise, Liverpool
Kniksen's honour award: Not Awarded

2007
Goalkeeper of the Year: Håkon Opdal, SK Brann
Defender of the Year: Frode Kippe, Lillestrøm SK
Midfielder of the Year: Alanzinho, Stabæk IF
Striker of the Year: Thorstein Helstad, SK Brann
Coach of the Year: Mons Ivar Mjelde, SK Brann
Referee of the Year: Terje Hauge, Olsvik IL
Kniksen of the Year: John Carew, Aston Villa
Kniksen's honour award: Ole Gunnar Solskjær, Manchester United

2008
Goalkeeper of the Year: Eddie Gustafsson, FC Lyn Oslo
Defender of the Year: Morten Morisbak Skjønsberg, Stabæk IF
Midfielder of the Year: Alanzinho, Stabæk IF
Striker of the Year: Daniel Nannskog, Stabæk IF
Coach of the Year: Jan Jönsson, Stabæk & Geir Nordby, Røa IL
Referee of the Year: Espen Berntsen, Vang
Kniksen of the Year: John Carew, Aston Villa
Kniksen's honour award: Ronny Johnsen

2009
Goalkeeper of the Year: Jon Knudsen, Stabæk
Defender of the Year: Knut Olav Rindarøy, Molde
Midfielder of the Year: Makhtar Thioune, Molde
Striker of the Year: Rade Prica, Rosenborg
Coach of the Year: Kjell Jonevret, Molde
Referee of the Year: Kristoffer Helgerud, Lier
Kniksen of the Year: Brede Hangeland, Fulham
Kniksen's honour award: Karen Espelund, former Secretary-General of the Norwegian Football Association

2010s

2010
Goalkeeper of the Year: Anders Lindegaard, Aalesund
Defender of the Year: Tom Høgli, Tromsø
Midfielder of the Year: Anthony Annan, Rosenborg
Striker of the Year: Mohammed Abdellaoue, Vålerenga
Coach of the Year: Jostein Grindhaug, Haugesund
Referee of the Year: Svein Oddvar Moen, Haugar
Kniksen of the Year: Anthony Annan, Rosenborg, Lisa-Marie Woods, Stabæk
Kniksen's honour award: Terje Hauge, Olsvik IL

2011
 Goalkeeper of the Year: Espen Bugge Pettersen, Molde
 Defender of the Year: Even Hovland, Sogndal
 Midfielder of the Year: Michael Barrantes, Aalesund
 Striker of the Year: Nikola Djurdjic, Haugesund
 Coach of the Year: Ole Gunnar Solskjær, Molde
 Referee of the Year: Svein Oddvar Moen, Haugar
 Kniksen of the Year: Mohammed Abdellaoue, Hannover
 Kniksen's honour award: Sigurd Rushfeldt, Tromsø

2012
 Goalkeeper of the Year: Kenneth Udjus, Sogndal
 Defender of the Year: Vegard Forren, Molde
 Midfielder of the Year: Magnus Wolff Eikrem, Molde
 Striker of the Year: Alexander Søderlund, Haugesund
 Coach of the Year: Ole Gunnar Solskjær, Molde
 Referee of the Year: Svein Oddvar Moen, Haugar
 Kniksen of the Year: Brede Hangeland, Fulham
Kniksen's honour award: Nils Skutle, Rosenborg

2013
 Goalkeeper of the Year: Adam Larsen Kwarasey, Strømsgodset
 Defender of the Year: Lars Christopher Vilsvik, Strømsgodset
 Midfielder of the Year: Stefan Johansen, Strømsgodset
 Striker of the Year: Frode Johnsen, Odd
 Coach of the Year: Ronny Deila, Strømsgodset
 1. divisjon Player of the Year: Badou, Bodø/Glimt
Kniksen's honour award: Not Awarded

2014
 Goalkeeper of the Year: Ørjan Nyland, Molde
 Defender of the Year: Martin Linnes, Molde
 Midfielder of the Year: Jone Samuelsen, Odd
 Striker of the Year: Vidar Örn Kjartansson, Vålerenga
 Coach of the Year: Tor Ole Skullerud, Molde
 Young Player of the Year: Martin Ødegaard, Strømsgodset
 Player of the Year: Jone Samuelsen, Odd
Kniksen's honour award: Boye Skistad

2015
 Goalkeeper of the Year: Ørjan Nyland, Molde
 Defender of the Year: Jonas Svensson, Rosenborg
 Midfielder of the Year: Ole Selnæs, Rosenborg
 Striker of the Year: Alexander Søderlund, Rosenborg
 Coach of the Year: Bob Bradley, Stabæk
 Young Player of the Year: Iver Fossum, Strømsgodset
 Player of the Year: Ole Selnæs, Rosenborg
Kniksen's honour award: Frode Johnsen, Odd

2016
 Goalkeeper of the Year: Piotr Leciejewski, Brann
 Defender of the Year: Jonas Svensson, Rosenborg
 Midfielder of the Year: Mike Jensen, Rosenborg
 Striker of the Year: Christian Gytkjær, Rosenborg
 Coach of the Year: Lars Arne Nilsen, Brann
 Young Player of the Year: Sander Berge, Vålerenga
 Player of the Year: Mike Jensen, Rosenborg
Kniksen's honour award: Daniel Berg Hestad, Molde

2017
Kniksen's honour award: Åge Hareide 

2018
Kniksen's honour award: Kjetil Rekdal

2019
Kniksen's honour award: Bjarne Berntsen, Viking and Ingrid Hjelmseth, Stabæk

2020s
2020
Kniksen's honour award: Erling Haaland, Borussia Dortmund
2021

 Kniksen's honour award: unknown

2022

 Kniksen's honour award: Martin Ødegaard, Arsenal

Other awards

This is a list of awards awarded in connection with the Kniksen awards, but not considered official Kniksen awards:

Gullballen

 2014: Stefan Johansen, Celtic
 2015: Ada Hegerberg, Lyon
 2016: Ada Hegerberg, Lyon
 2017: Joshua King, Bournemouth

From 2018, the Gullballen has been awarded to both a male and a female footballer.

Men
 2018: Rune Jarstein, Hertha BSC
 2019: Martin Ødegaard, SBV Vitesse / Real Sociedad
 2020: Erling Haaland, Borussia Dortmund

Women
 2018: Ada Hegerberg, Lyon
 2019: Caroline Graham Hansen, VfL Wolfsburg / Barcelona
 2020: Caroline Graham Hansen, Barcelona

Eliteserien

Player of the Year
 2017: Tore Reginiussen, Rosenborg
 2018: André Hansen, Rosenborg
 2019: Håkon Evjen, Bodø/Glimt
 2020: Philip Zinckernagel, Bodø/Glimt
 2021: Patrick Berg, Bodø/Glimt
 2022: Hugo Vetlesen, Bodø/Glimt

Goal of the Year
 2007: Fredrik Gulsvik, Odd (against Lyn)
 2017: Nicklas Bendtner, Rosenborg (against Molde)
 2018: Jon-Helge Tveita, Sarpsborg 08 (against Vålerenga)
 2019: Ola Brynhildsen, Stabæk (against Rosenborg)

Breakthrough of the Year
 2017: Krépin Diatta, Sarpsborg 08
 2018: Erling Haaland, Molde

Young Player of the Year
 2019: Håkon Evjen, Bodø/Glimt
 2020: Jens Petter Hauge, Bodø/Glimt
 2021: Mads Hedenstad Christiansen, Lillestrøm
 2022: Sivert Mannsverk, Molde

Coach of the Year
 2017: Kåre Ingebrigtsen, Rosenborg
 2018: Svein Maalen, Ranheim
 2019: Kjetil Knutsen, Bodø/Glimt
 2020: Kjetil Knutsen, Bodø/Glimt
 2021: Kjetil Knutsen, Bodø/Glimt
 2022: Erling Moe, Molde

Toppserien

Player of the Year
 2010: Lisa-Marie Woods, Stabæk Kvinner
 2018: Guro Reiten, LSK Kvinner
 2019: Sherida Spitse, Vålerenga
 2020: Ingibjörg Sigurdardóttir, Vålerenga

Goal of the Year
 2018: Guro Reiten, LSK Kvinner (against Vålerenga)
 2019: Karina Sævik, Kolbotn (against Avaldsnes)
 2020: Elin Sørum, Rosenborg (against Lyn)

Breakthrough of the Year
 2018: Emilie Nautnes, Arna-Bjørnar
 2020: Elin Sørum, Rosenborg

Young Player of the Year
 2019: Julie Blakstad, Fart

Coach of the Year
 2018: Hege Riise, LSK Kvinner
 2019: Hege Riise, LSK Kvinner
 2020: Steinar Lein, Rosenborg

1. divisjon

Player of the Year
 2006: Mattias Andersson, Strømsgodset
 2013: Papa Alioune Ndiaye, Bodø/Glimt
 2017: Kristian Fardal Opseth, Bodø/Glimt
 2018: Johnny Furdal, Viking
 2019: Niklas Castro, Aalesund
 2020: Sivert Mannsverk, Sogndal

Breakthrough of the Year
 2018: Kristian Thorstvedt, Viking
 2019: Anton Kralj, Sandefjord
 2020: Henrik Udahl, Åsane

Coach of the Year
 2017: Aasmund Bjørkan, Bodø/Glimt
 2018: Steffen Landro, Nest-Sotra
 2019: Lars Bohinen, Aalesund
 2020: Morten Røssland, Åsane

See also 
 Gullballen
 NTF football awards

References

Association football trophies and awards
Eliteserien
Awards established in 1990
1990 establishments in Norway
Norwegian sports trophies and awards
Annual events in Norway